The Tiny Bang Story is a puzzle point-and-click adventure game developed by Colibri Games. It was released on 22 April 2011 for Microsoft Windows and macOS on Steam. It was ported and published to iOS in Q2`2012 by Colibri Games. It was ported to Android and published on Google Play by HeroCraft in Q3`2012. A port for Linux was made available in June 2015, for AppleTV on 2 Februari 2016, and a Nintendo Switch version was released on 4 October 2019 in collaboration with Ellada Games. A ports to Windows phone exists as well.

Gameplay 

The goal of The Tiny Bang Story is to find hidden objects in the form of jigsaw pieces and solve a series of 30 logical puzzles. The puzzles are connected together in a point and click adventure story, consisting of 5 short chapters that each end with a splash screen where the user has to piece the found jigsaw pieces together.

The protagonist of the adventure story is the user, and is never portrayed, although there is some minor interaction with in-game characters. The Tiny Bang Story is notable in that it contains no spoken or written dialogue.

Development 

The Tiny Bang Story was developed by Colibri Games, an independent game development studio. Eduard Arutyunyan is the artist for the game, and Dmitriy Sannikov is the programmer. Andrey Arutyunyan was later added to the team to handle the business aspects. The art of the game was inspired by Dutch classic art, and the video game Machinarium by Amanita Design.

Reception 

The Tiny Bang Story received mixed reviews on release. The average score on critic aggregate site Metacritic is 63/100, and 58% on GameRankings. Reviewers unanimously applaud the hand-drawn art style, calling it "gorgeous" or "absolutely stunning",. However most reviewers criticise the short playtime. Rock Paper Shotgun considers "hidden object games as potentially great puzzles, and The Tiny Bang Story is a superb piece of evidence for that", and subsequently declaring it the #20 "Best Puzzle Games Ever Made". XGN and AdventureGamers feels the puzzles are "easy" and "repetitive". GamePitt notes that the "easiness makes the game suitable for the whole family, including younger children".

References 

2011 video games
Adventure games
Android (operating system) games
Classic Mac OS games
HeroCraft games
IOS games
Linux games
Nintendo Switch games
Single-player video games
Video games developed in Russia
Windows games